Germany's Next Topmodel (often abbreviated as GNTM) is a German reality television series, based on a concept introduced by Tyra Banks with America's Next Top Model. The competition is hosted by Heidi Klum who also serves as the lead judge and executive producer of the show. It is currently the longest-airing Top Model adaptation at 18 years and the second adaptation to have the most cycles. The show is heavily criticized in Germany because of the treatment of its contestants. The allegations include Gaslighting, Abuse of power, misrepresentation of contestants  and Manipulations by the crew  as well as Body shaming.

Show format
Germany's Next Topmodel currently has 18 seasons. Each season has 10 to 17 episodes and starts with 12–31 contestants. During each episode, one contestant is eliminated, though a double/triple elimination or no elimination was given by the consensus of the judging panel.

Makeovers are administered to contestants early in the competition (usually after the first or second elimination in the finals).

Differences between ANTM and GNTM
America's Next Top Model typically started with 30 semi-finalists who are cut down to a batch of between 10 and 16 contestants, Germany's Next Top Model season premieres begin with highlights from the auditions of 100 candidates (cycles 1 and 2) and 120 candidates (cycle 3) respectively.

The panel challenge in front of the judges on America's Next Top Model is almost always replaced by a runway walk in front of the judges on the German show.

In the elimination process on America's Next Top Model, host Tyra Banks hands out a photograph to each of the contestants who are safe, in order of merit. The bottom two of each episode are called to stand before Banks and are judged individually.

The call-out order does play a major role in determining who this week's best contestant was – quite in contrast to Germany's Next Top Model where the call-out order does not say anything about the quality of the contestants' performance, except in the final. Moreover, they are called out one by one while the others are waiting in the backstage lobby. The US contestants are all present. GNTM also starts the finale with 3 or 4 contestants left, it usually takes 2h. In ANTM, the finale starts with 2 or 3 contestants left and takes 1h.

The final five or six contestants travel to an international destination on the American show while Germany's version is noncommittal about the number of journeys abroad; cycle 1 went abroad two times, cycle 2 did so four times and cycle 3 went to six different countries.

On America's Next Top Model, the final two or three contestants compete on a runway, and the winner is chosen in the judging room. On Germany's Next Top Model, the final three or four contestants compete on a runway and a photo shoot in front of a live audience in Cologne, Germany before the winner is revealed. The final show is live on TV. Cycle 4 final show was the first to air live from a concert hall instead of a TV studio.

Due to the pregnancy of Heidi Klum, the start of the fifth season was postponed and kicked off in March. Instead a spin-off called Die Model WG was shown featuring several former contestants from the show and hosted by judge Peyman Amin.

Host and judges
Only Heidi Klum herself has been part of the judging panel on every cycle. All the other permanent judges have always been male. Thomas Hayo remained a permanent judge for the longest (six consecutive cycles), followed by Peyman Amin (four consecutive cycles). After leaving the show, Amin eventually hosted the show's spin-off, Die Model WG, and signed cycle 5's winner Alisar Ailabouni despite never meeting her on the show. And although Boris Entrup only was a regular judge on cycle two, he still was part of the show until 2017 as the makeup advisor for the girls. In 2017 Wolfgang Joop became the first former judge to return as he was a guest judge for one episode as well as the finale, he came back in 2018 as well.

The judging panel since the 14th season consists of guest judges only with Klum being the only permanent judge.

Criticism and controversies 

Since Season 5, the show's ratings decreased. In an attempt to increase the ratings, the format is increasingly focusing on conflicts between contestants.

In 2009, German model Julia Stegner said that Germany's Next Top Model had "little to do with the reality of modelling."

In 2011, season 5 winner Alisar Ailabouni withdrew from her contract with ONEeins Management (which is managed by Heidi Klum's father Günther), which she received as part of her prize page for winning the competition. This was the first time a winner of the show sued her way out of a prize contract. Ailabouni was not invited to Season 6's live finale, while several ProSieben-related magazines referred to Season 4 winner Sara Nuru as "last year's winner", given she was working as a backstage host. Since then, a number of other contestants have withdrawn from their contracts with ONEeins, including Viktoria Lantratova and Miriam Höller (both Season 5), Jana Beller (Season 6 winner), Luise Will (Season 8) and Aminata Sanogo (Season 9).

In 2012, former judge Rolf Scheider criticized the program, saying, "The show has never produced a new Nadja Auermann or Claudia Schiffer", and that girls who "lack modelling talent" are selected purely for ratings. Regardless of this, he appeared on the fifth cycle of Austria's Next Top Model as a judge.

In 2013, Klum was criticized by German comedian Cordula Stratmann, who branded Klum "the face and soul of a cold-hearted, disgusting production" and "the trainer in malice and condescension."

In May 2013, during the live finale of Season 8, Klum was attacked by two topless Femen activists, Zana Ramadani and Hellen Langhorst, who flashed her.

In April 2014, Miriam Höller, from Season 5 said in an interview that contestants are poorly treated on the show; for example, they are not given enough food or their mobile phones are taken away. She also said that Klum was "extremely cold", and criticized the cooperation with Günther Klum. She also mentioned that a client who had worked with her before the show wanted to book her but ONEeins said Höller was busy, even though she wasn't busy at that time. The client was offered to book Sara Nuru instead of Höller.

In April 2014, German model Eva Padberg said that the show was just entertainment and not the reality of model business. She also expressed her hopes for participating girls to know this.

In May 2015, psychiatrist Manfred Lütz said according to a study "GNTM" promoted anorexia. Also, in that time, "Germany's Next Topmodel" was checked by the German Commission for the Protection of Minors in the Media (Kommission für Jugendmedienschutz). Since the first Season, the show is subject of repeated checks by the commission.

In September 2015, former judge Wolfgang Joop criticized the show as well, stating he didn't want to be part of that anymore since "The viewers expect things that the fashion expert does not. Namely, contestants collapsing, getting homesick, crying and falling on their heels. These are stories that do not interest us in the fashion world."

In 2017 in Episode 9 of Season 12 the contestants had a photo shoot on a bed with male models wearing lingerie. The photo shoot took place in the streets of Los Angeles and caused a car accident and Heidi Klum made fun of that accident. The audience and several media criticized Heidi Klum and the show for that.

In May 2017 the finale of Season 12 aired and Heidi Klum was heavily criticized by the media and audience for her performance. For example, Süddeutsche Zeitung said, that the only winner of the show after 12 Seasons is just Heidi Klum and not the participants. They criticized that it does not matter who is winning the show, because it is only about promotion, the showmanship of Heidi Klum herself and about showing a pestilent body image. Among other things, Heidi Klum had sung by means of Playback and was criticized for the quality of this performance by Spiegel Online. In addition to that, the Season 12 finale had very low ratings.

Also in May 2017 the German radio and television broadcaster Philipp Walulis criticized the show and its practices within his YouTube-show "Walulis" as well. His main criticism is that the contestants get gagging contracts and that the show is only concerned about advertising campaigns instead of the contestants. Within this video, former contestants have their say.

Beth Ditto said in June 2017: "I see it very critically that in programs like this girls are stirred up against each other. There are so many other ways to do what you want without such a show that destroys so many dreams."

In May 2018 Season 13 contestant Victoria Pavlas officially said that Pro7 and the Team behind Germany's Next Top Model portrayed her in a wrong way on television. She said: "I do not want to be portrayed like this by Pro7 only for Fame." In addition to that, like many contestants in the history of the show, she also got out of her contract, and she did not appear on the live finale.

In 2019 Season 4 contestant Tessa Bergmeier criticized the show and revealed the practices of the crew behind the camera, stating: "The production people often put words and phrases in the contestants' mouths that they would never have said." She also said, that she never applied for the show, she was hired because of her emotional nature.

In 2019 in Season 14 there was a physical fight between contestants Jasmin Cadete and Lena Lischewski shown on Television, leading to the disqualification of Cadete. The lawyer of Lischewski sued ProSieben and the cameramen saying: "It is unacceptable that a television station films how a minor is beaten by another participant during the filming and the present camera crew does not intervene immediately, but continues to film the scene."

Also in Season 14 in 2019 after Vanessa Stanat quit, ProSieben took over her official Instagram account. Shortly after, Stanat did not have access to her personal account either. Many, including Stanat herself, believe that this happened due to ProSieben being angry about her announcing her quit just a few weeks before the finale. Rebecca Mir took to Instagram to discredit Stanat, however she and ProSieben received backlash, because ProSieben shared personal information about Stanat with Mir.

In 2020, Season 14 winner Simone Kowalski said that "it is not right that it is perceived as entertainment, how young people bring each other down." She also stated, that she is not able to watch the show.

In March 2020 contestant Abigail Odoom (Season 13) revealed that she had a car accident during a challenge in which a fast driving car was involved. That was covered up by the show. She also said, that she was not allowed to talk about the car accident. She also said that she was not taken care of quickly enough after the accident and that she did not feel treated appropriately afterwards.

Contestant Lijana Kaggwa received death threats after participating in Season 15 of Germany's Next Topmodel. She told that she was spat on the street, her car was refilled and people tried to poison her dog which led to police protection. Therefore, she took the consequences herself and quit in the live final. Christian Vock from web.de criticized the show for not being completely aware of the death threats. He said that the editing room was mainly used to show unpleasant statements from Lijana on TV and thus exaggerate it. Mareike Fangmann from Stern (magazine) wrote: The broadcasting channel ProSieben also has complicity because the broadcaster knows exactly how to cut scenes together in order to identify a clear bitch. Good for the ratings, good for the show. [...] But ProSieben should have protected Lijana beforehand. Could have omitted scenes to protect her and thus incited less hatred. In December 2020 Lijana Kaggwa also stated: "The broadcast of GNTM 2020 completely ruined me mentally. I've become a different person. Bit by bit it took away my self-confidence and my lust for life."

In December 2020 Nathalie Volk (contestant from Season 9) stated, that she would rather jump out of a window than ever working again with Heidi Klum.

In December 2020 Season 14 winner Simone Kowalski met Günther Klum (the father of Heidi Klum) in court. In the end, the court decided: The employment contract with Günther Klum will be terminated retrospectively and Simone will receive her full salary.

In February 2021 Season 15 winner Jacky Wruck has sued from her employment contract with Heidi Klum GmbH & Co. KG / ONE eins fab Management. This was announced by her lawyer.

In February 2021 in Season 16 the contestants had to walk nude in front of Heidi Klum. That would be heavily criticized by the audience and even by the German Ministry of Family Affairs, Senior Citizens, Women and Youth. The Ministry stated: "Sexism is not something that we can simply tolerate or ignore. Together we need to be very clear about sexism for what it is: namely, a form of violence.". Also Season 10 winner Vanessa Fuchs said, that she wouldn't have done that, saying: "My fashion shows weren't nude shows."

In March 2021 former contestant Jana Heinisch said, that disputes are deliberately provoked with lies from the production company. The crew manipulates the contestants behind the scenes. The edit alone decides whether a girl is likeable or not.

In April 2021 in Season 16 the contestants had to do a photo shoot at a height of 122 meters. Contestant Linda Braunberger had a panic attack during the shoot and because of that, she was eliminated by Heidi Klum. This was heavily criticized by the media and viewers. Braunbeger also stated, like many contestants before, that she was portrayed in a wrong and very negative way, saying: "I've already noticed that I was portrayed in a blatantly negative way. We also had nice moments together, but unfortunately they weren't shown."

Also in April 2021, former contestant Theresia Fischer said, that the contestants were only allowed to go to the toilet if they had signed off. 
When the show started, it was no longer possible to go to the toilet.

In Season 16 six contestants quit the competition, most of them stating, that during the shooting of the show they were not feeling well, especially mentally.

Contestant Ashley Amegan (Season 16) said the production team had bullied her into changing her personality for the show. That's why she left the show even though she made it to the live finale.

As of 2021 three finalists quit the competition before the live finale.

In February 2022 once again the contestants had one of the countless nude photo shoots for the 17th season. This time the girls had to pose fully naked in a public area. Some of the girls were not covered at all and in a result to that paparazzi took pictures of the girls and very explicit pictures ended up on the internet. Once again the production company, Heidi Klum and the broadcasting channel ProSieben were heavily criticized for the fact that the naked shooting took place in public and the girls were not protected.

In April 2022, the head of MGM Models, Marco Sinervo, criticized Germany's Next Topmodel. He said the format has absolutely nothing to do with models or fashion, but a lot with the abuse of those who should actually be under protection. The contestants get into the meat grinder of a totally scripted and therefore completely exaggerated drama in which they can and should just lose their nerve - from the supposedly necessary nude shoot or 'makeover' to the isolation from their families and the gag contracts that make them more like serfs of ProSieben and Klum's father Günther for years. A couple of pretty girls are set against each other, humiliated and become lead actresses in a verbal mud fight. It's a purely commercial shit show, designed as a money machine for Heidi Klum. In the end the contestants often ended up as mental wrecks that nobody wants to work with anymore.

Also in April 2022 the former contestant Tamara Hitz (season 15) criticized the show. Like so many contestants before her, she confirmed: "Some producers try to steer the girls' actions in a certain direction during interviews. A lot of things didn't even come out of our mouths. There was always some petrol poured into the fire." She also reveals, that the contestants always had an inkling of who had to go because that contestant is being filmed more often than normal, before the actual elimination happens, proofing the fake scripted background of the show and the cruel treatment of the entire production with the contestants.

Also in April 2022 Heidi Klum and Germany's Next Topmodel are accused of Diversity Washing.

In April 2022 Hendrik Busch from the online magazine Moviepilot described Germany's Next Topmodel as manipulative psycho terror.

In May 2022 former contestant Lijana Kaggwa (Season 15) who received death threats and had to experience cyberbullying after her participation in Germany's Next Topmodel reveals the inhumane practices of Germany's Next Topmodel in a YouTube video. The video has 2.4 million views in nine days. Nathalie Volk (contestant from Season 9) said that Lijana Kaggwa is telling the truth and furthermore that this show is bullying and assault. There was an incident when Heidi Klum threw her into the pool and threw off-color balloons. She was 16 years old at the time and also bled. She said: "I have scars on my body because of Heidi." The broadcaster ProSieben takes legal action against Lijana Kaggwa and Nathalie Volk. Volk said: "I find it unbelievable that the broadcaster would like to report us, Lijana and me. I've also spoken to many Americans here. They are also totally appalled that the broadcaster and the broadcasting group want to sue young women for telling the truth." She also stated that she is still traumatized by the show. Lijana Kaggwa has published more details about the Germany's Next Topmodel  crew's manipulations in a second video. Within the video, other contestants confirm the incidents: Nina-Sue Wurm (Season 15), Maribel Sancia Todt (Season 15), Nathalie Volk (Season 9), Neele Bronst (Season 12), Lenara Klawitter (Season 17) and Vanessa Stanat (Season 14).

Also in May 2022 Chiara "Kiki" Hölzl (contestant from Season 10) revealed that she broke her arm during a photo shoot and this was covered up by the show.

In May 2022 In the course of the allegations of former contestants against the show and Heidi Klum, the Germany-wide very famous Youtuber Rezo also strongly criticized Germany's Next Topmodel and was surprised that the show had not yet been cancelled. His video is called: "Abu$e, lies and minors".

Heidi Klum's net worth is estimated at $130 million. She is said to earn $10 million per season of Germany's Next Topmodel.

Also, in May 2022, Season 17 contestant Jasmin Jägers boycotted the live finale of season 17. Due to the bad experiences of former participants, she no longer wants to be associated with Germany's Next Topmodel.

In May 2022, during the live finale of Season 17, Heidi Klum said about the criticism of the show: "Dear critics, unfortunately I have to disappoint you. We're going on as before." This was condemned in the strongest terms by both the German media and viewers and caused outrage in Germany. Der Spiegel (online) headlined: "Final in Heidi's torture cellar". Stern (magazine) headlined "Stupid instead of diversity - how Heidi Klum doesn't want to change anything"  and T-Online said: "The ego show of the GNTM deadbeat mom". The well-known German comedian Carolin Kebekus said "Germany's Next Topmodel made many great: eating disorders, self-loathing, cyberbullying" and "this year they went crazy for diversity because every woman has the right to be humiliated by Heidi Klum."

In July 2022 after Lijana Kaggwa (Season 15) was sued by the creators for her criticism of the show, the court agreed that Lijana Kaggwa was right on crucial points. She can now officially say and write: "The production of 'Germany's Next Topmodel' manipulated me on the set in such a way that I correspond to the role model of the bitch. Entire actions were given to me.” Lijana Kaggwa can therefore continue to be critical about the show and has just announced another unveiling video on Instagram, which is supposed to be about the court process and the verdict.

In August 2022 Marie Nasemann (contestant from Season 4) revealed that she suffers from the spinal condition Scoliosis. Back in 2009, during the fourth season, her Scoliosis was discussed at a casting for Samsung. The editors of Germany's Next Topmodel tried to make her cry because of her illness and she also reveals: "I found out years later that Samsung would have liked to book me, but from the production side it wasn't allowed".

In August 2022 the German personality Désirée Nick published an interview with Nathalie Volk (Season 9) within her podcast. She criticized: "What could be easier than to play your power over little girls who trust you? That is morally very questionable, like everything Heidi Klum has ever done".

In August 2022 in the wake of allegations by former participants against Germany's Next Topmodel, the winner of the 14th season, Simone Kowalski, also spoke up as she said: "Top Model is very dangerous for today's and the previous generations! Many young women have mental trauma! Heidi says she's just being the hostess, but she has a responsibility to at least face the pain and trauma that has been inflicted on many girls!". Kowalski also teamed up with America's Next Top Model contestant Lisa D'Amato to talk about her traumatic experiences with Germany's Next Topmodel. She said during the interview, that Germany's Next Topmodel made her sick: "They took everything from me, I almost lost my family, my friends, all my money. It was inhuman - they broke me mentally. I came on the show healthy and got sick." She also said that after the show she was forced against her will to work for Heidi Klum's father. To former contestants defending the show, she says: "Good for you, but not for everyone". In her opinion, Germany's Next Topmodel should be discontinued.

In September 2022, the winner of the 4th season, Sara Nuru, joined the criticism of the show as she said: "I was not aware of how blatantly young women were treated there. It was as if I had blinders on, a lot is me I wasn't aware of it even as a participant. I'm still horrified by how young women are treated." She added: "With the knowledge I have today, I would not take part in Germany's Next Topmodel again."

In December 2022 Anna Maria Damm (contestant from Season 8) said: "Germany's Next Topmodel messed up my modeling".

In January 2023, the relentless criticism continued when former contestant Tessa Bergmeier (Season 4) criticized the Show and Heidi Klum live in front of an audience of millions during her participation in the 16th season of I'm a Celebrity - Get Me Out of Here. In a conversation with model Papis Loveday, she said: "They screwed me! I found it unfair. I had no idea what kind of light they wanted to put me in. They portrayed me as a bitch. [...] They made me a monster, I wasn't." Bergmeier describes Klum as "super-mega psycho. The devil is in her. [...] She laughs at little girls [...] A person who can torment others without any feeling of guilt. I couldn't continue modelling in Hamburg, no client wanted me anymore." Papis Loveday, who also worked on GNTM, added about Klum: "She only thinks of herself. Nobody can shine more than she does."

By 2023, many celebrities have publicly spoken out against the show and criticizing it such as Beth Ditto, Eva Padberg, Julia Stegner, Carolin Kebekus, Cordula Stratmann, Désirée Nick, Wolfgang Joop, Roger Willemsen, Sara Nuru, Simone Kowalski also as Femen and even the German   Federal Ministry of Family Affairs, Senior Citizens, Women and Youth.

In February 2023 Der Spiegel (online) gives a glimpse into the notorious gag contracts that candidates have to sign in order to be able to take part in the Heidi Klum show. According to the Hamburg lawyer Jörg Nabert, these are "illegal gag contracts". The contract binds the women to an agency for two years. A regulation that, according to Nabert, is not customary in the industry. The participants also agree that the recordings "present them in a way that they don't like themselves". According to Der Spiegel (online), the contracts say: "The contributors are aware of any burdens that may result for them". If necessary, “substantive suggestions” would be made and enforced by the show management. Germany's Next Topmodel can thus stylize people like Tessa Bergmeier (Season 4) as "bitches" without them being able to defend themselves effectively afterwards. Heidi Klum's casting show goes further than similar formats with this practice.

In February 2023, the Berliner Zeitung published an article about the show with the headline: "Why isn't Germany’s Next Topmodel actually canceled?" 

In February 2023, the German InTouch wrote: "The willingness to use violence among girls is increasing. They form gangs, bully, hit. Heidi is also partly responsible for the fact that, at least on TV, such behavior should not lead to extra airtime..." The article goes on to say: "With Germany’s Next Topmodel absolutely wrong values ​​​​are conveyed. It gives the impression that bullying is a legitimate means of dealing with each other."

In February 2023, the Neue Osnabrücker Zeitung wrote that Germany’s Next Topmodel is one of the worst trash TV programs on German television. And: "anyone who watches Heidi Klum is just as bad as she is."

In February 2023, the former judge Peyman Armin criticized the show and Heidi Klum as well. He said: "It has become a pure self-portrayal by Heidi. Heidi comes first. Then Heidi and Heidi again. When Heidi Klum is in the foreground and takes care of the slapstick, for sensational shootings and catfights." Part of the episodes are therefore always scenes in which Heidi Klum would blaspheme with jurors about the contestants.

Also in February 2023, former judge Wolfgang Joop criticized the show and Heidi Klum again when he said he had no say in the decisions. "Heidi does that. Nobody can help there." Not even the producers were allowed to have a say, apart from the timing of the direction. Joop: "Then they say something like: 'Don't let her go yet, the boyfriend will come, that'll bring a lot of tears of joy, we'll take that with us.'" He added: "I wouldn't have been surprised if the show had been discontinued."

In February 2023 at the beginning of the 18th season, Heidi Klum gave a 10-minute speech in which she denied all allegations against her and the show and blamed the candidates themselves. This was once again heavily criticized by both the viewers and the media in Germany. The Berliner Morgenpost wrote: "Everything is wrong, says Klum. She emphasized that 'everything is real' on her show. There is no text or storyline for the models. That's why it's not her fault if a young model feels misrepresented after the broadcast. 'We can only portray a person as they are,' philosophizes Klum. Whether this is true remains questionable. On the one hand, because a story can be cobbled together afterwards that doesn't have to have anything to do with reality. On the other hand, because in the show very young girls in absolutely exceptional and stressful situations meet experienced editors who know exactly what the viewers later want to see on television." Die Welt called Heidi Klum's statement "bizarre". Frankfurter Allgemeine called it a "Catwalk of Shame". Web.de headlined: "Why Heidi Klum's statement is dishonest". Annabelle (magazine) (Switzerland) headlined: "Heidi Klum, this justification went wrong". In an article, Puls24 (Austria) asked whether Heidi Klum practiced perpetrator-victim reversal and Gaslighting. Frankfurter Allgemeine headlined: "This woman only has dollar signs in her eyes" and also assumed that Heidi Klum was doing a perpetrator-victim reversal. BILD asked: "How evil is Heidi Klum really?".

Cycles

External links 

 Official website
 Official YouTube Channel
 
 GNTM-blog.de / German fanbase

References

 
2006 German television series debuts
2010s German television series
2020s German television series
German-language television shows
ProSieben original programming
German television series based on American television series